Prishib is a rural locality (a selo) and the administrative centre of Alexeyevsky Selsoviet, Blagovarsky District, Bashkortostan, Russia. The population was 907 as of 2010. There are 8 streets.

Geography 
Prishib is located 31 km northeast of Yazykovo (the district's administrative centre) by road. Moiseyevo is the nearest rural locality.

References 

Rural localities in Blagovarsky District